Kunduru Jana Reddy (born 20 June 1946) is an Indian politician. He was the leader of opposition in first Telangana Assembly and served as the Minister for Panchayat Raj & Rural Water Supply in the State of Andhra Pradesh during its term from 2009 to 2014. He was among the most prominent cabinet ministers of the ruling Indian National Congress (INC) and served as Minister for Home, Jails, Fire Service, Sainik Welfare, Printing & Stationery in the government led by the late former Chief Minister Dr Y. S. Rajasekhara Reddy from 2004 to 2009. In 2009 elections he won with a margin of 6214 votes against industrialist turned politician of TDP Chinappa Reddy Tera. In 2014 he won with a margin of 16558 votes over Nomula Narsimaiah of TRS in the year where Congress lost the majority vote. He lost the 1994 elections to TDP candidate Gundeboina Rammoorthy Yadav.

Early life and politics

Jana Reddy was born in Anumula, a village near historic Nagarjuna Sagar in the Nalgonda district. His political career started by joining the Telugu Desam Party founded by Nandamuri Taraka Rama Rao, and was first elected to the State Legislature from the Chalakurthi constituency of the Nalgonda district in 1983. He was re-elected for seven terms to the Assembly from the Chalakurthi constituency, and went on to hold portfolios such as Agriculture, Co-operative, Marketing, Forest, Animal Husbandry, Fisheries, Weights & Measures, C.A.D., Transport, Roads & Buildings, Housing Panchayath Raj, Rural water scheme and Sanitation in the government of Andhra Pradesh. He is the longest serving cabinet minister in government of Telangana breaking the record of Sri Kasu Bramanadha Reddy former chief minister of A.P.

Jana Reddy resigned from the Telugu Desam Party after differing with N.T. Rama Rao on expelling 30 cabinet ministers in 1988 and founded a political party - Telugumahanadu which eventually merged with Congress on call given by then AICC president Shri Late Rajiv Gandhi ji. He played an active role in reviving the Congress Party specifically in the Telangana Region to fight the then ruling Telugu Desam Party which lost the elections in 2004 to the Congress Party. Jana Reddy was sworn in as the Minister for Home Affairs in the 2004 AP Cabinet for his progressive contribution to the Congress Party.

Known for his vast experience spanning 30 years in AP state politics, administration and impeccable track record Jana Reddy, served as the Minister for Panchayati Raj & RWS - Andhra Pradesh, apart from being active in the Telangana movement and has led various delegations to All India Congress Committee (AICC) representing the Telangana Statehood issue.

Political statistics

References

External links
AP NIC website of K Jana Reddy
Council of Ministers: K.Jana Reddy
WordPress on K Jana Reddy

1946 births
Living people
Indian National Congress politicians
Telangana MLAs 2014–2018
People from Nalgonda district
People from Telangana
Telangana politicians
Telugu politicians
Telugu Desam Party politicians
Home Ministers of Andhra Pradesh
Leaders of the Opposition in Telangana
Janata Party politicians